Clément Saint-Martin (born 16 August 1991 in Gruchet-le-Valasse) is a French cyclist, who currently rides for French amateur team Pro Immo Nicolas Roux.

Major results

2012
 1st Vienne Classic Espoirs
2013
 1st Grand Prix de la ville de Buxerolles
2014
 1st  Mountains classification Ronde de l'Oise
 8th Grand Prix de Plumelec-Morbihan
 8th Tour du Jura
2019
 10th Overall Tour de Normandie
 10th Grand Prix des Marbriers

References

External links

1991 births
Living people
French male cyclists